Eoanabas thibetana is an extinct climbing gourami from the Late Oligocene of Tibet.

References

Oligocene fish
Prehistoric ray-finned fish genera
Anabantidae